Daniel Ferreira (born 1981) is a Colombian writer and blogger. He was born in San Vicente de Chucuri in the mountainous province of Santander, and moved to Bogota to study linguistics at the National University. He is the author of several award-winning novels such as La balada de los bandoleros baladíes, Viaje al interior de una gota de sangre and Rebelión de los oficios inútiles. 

In 2017, he was named as one of the Bogota39, a selection of the best young writers in Latin America.

References

Colombian writers
1981 births
Living people